Moskvitch 2140 series is a supermini car produced by Soviet automotive maker AZLK from January 1976 to 1988. It started first as Moskvitch 2138 and Moskvitch 2140 on a modified 412 platform. Pre-production models were shown during 1975. Starting in 1981, the modernised modification of the M-2140 export/luxury model was also designed and branded "2140 SL" in the Eastern Bloc countries and "1500 SL" outside. The most notable differences between the two models were redesigned dashboard and front seat headrests in the M-2140.

Starting in 1982, the M-2138 models were discontinued and the M-2140 became the only Moskvitch car available in all markets. It was face-lifted the same year: the shield logo was changed to feature "АЗЛК" (AZLK) written in metallic outline, the grille coating switched from metal to plastic, and both side mirrors were slightly redesigned to be less heavy. The station wagon variant M-2137 was the last of Soviet cars to still feature taillight fins to accommodate gate opening, until the model was discontinued in 1985.

Although originally designed and often referenced to as the "fourth generation", the series was, in fact, only an enhancement over the actual third generation of Moskvitches, the M-408/412. The brand-new fourth generation entered in production with the Aleko starting in 1986, when both series shared the assembly line for over two years, until the M-2140 was eventually discontinued in July 1988.

Models and variants
 M-2140 (export name Moskvitch 1500): the original four-door sedan model with standard engine UZAM-412 (75 hp). The 2140 entered production in January 1976 and was discontinued in July 1988.
 M-2138 (export name Moskvitch 1360, produced in 1976-1982): 4-door sedan model, similar to the M-408 series, with low-power engine MZMA-408 (50 hp). This version appeared because the Ufa plant could not supply enough UZAM-412 engines, this series was not designed for the MZMA-408 engine. However, its success was limited, because it was heavily underpowered , outdated, had a higher fuel consumption, and the price was the same as the 1500 version. However, it was more successful in countryside, driving schools and taxi, where lower performances were not an issue, rather than personal car, although it was also sold to public. Because 21406 appeared in 1978, and UFA factory could already supply the UZAM-412 engines, its sales dropped quickly, as 21406 was preferred.
 M-21381 (1976-1981): four-door sedan and ambulance fly-car similar to the ambulance version M-408M of the M-408 series.
 M-21401 (1976-1988): four-door sedan and ambulance fly-car similar to the M-412M of the M-412 series.
 M-21402 (export name Moskvitch 1500): the original four-door sedan export model with right steering wheel.
 M-21406 (1978-1987): four-door sedan for the countryside, with drum brakes on all wheels, towing lugs, and derated engine redesigned to run on low-octane fuel , as low as 75. It had a lower compression 7,5:1, a power of (68 hp)/4800 rpm instead of (75 hp) /5800 rpm and a torque of 105 nm / 2500–3000 rpm instead of 115 nm / 3000–3800 rpm. Top speed was 135 km/h, with a 23 seconds  0 - 100 km/h sprint. Not available on station wagon. Also, the rear side where the rear light are mounted had the same colour as the entire body instead of black on usual models, making this as the only distinguishing element from the usual 2140 as well as they were delivered without wheel hubs, and looking at the front wheels, the drum brake was visible and had a slightly higher ground clearance and a stiffer suspension . Like other version, the towing hook on the rear was mounted on demand. The front grill was different, bearing just a simple AZLK sign, rather than the logo of AZLK - MOSKVITCH. 
 M-21403 (1980-1987): four-door sedan with hand controls for the disabled.
 M-2140-117 (export name Moskvitch 1500SL, 1981–1988): luxury four-door sedan model with plastic bumpers, new safety panel and headrests.
 M-2140-121 (1982-1987): four-door taxi equipped with a different engine with low compression (the same as 21406), a taximeter, a "Taxi" sign, easily cleanable upholstered seats, and synthetic leather.
 M-2136 (1977-1978): station wagon similar to the M-426 of the M-408 series. Not many manufactured, it was quickly taken out of production, because the engine was way too underpowered, the engine was too small for the sedan version, on the station wagon it could barely face it due to higher weight. Some manufactured cars were used as taxis.
 M-2137 (1976-1985): station wagon similar to the M-427 of the M-412 series. It was the last of family wagon Moskvitches with no actual successor (besides the Izh Kombi hatchback).
 M-2733/34 (1976-1981): "closed-body" delivery van, similar to the M-433/34 of the M-408/412 series, built for non-consumer purposes. Exclusive special-versions included ambulance and hearse.
 М-2315 (2140–80, produced in 1984-1988): pickup truck commercial modification to the body pickup. Based on the sedan and station wagon.
 M-2140 Diesel. Manufactured Mainly between 1979 and 1981. Similar to 2138 and 2140 in appearance, but equipped with a 4.108 diesel engine from Perkins. Mainly for Italy, but also for other markets. Top speed was only 120 km/h, but offered a better fuel economy than both petrol engines. Not available on station wagon.

Gallery

References

Cars introduced in 1976
2140
Soviet automobiles
Subcompact cars
Sedans
1970s cars
1980s cars